Asquith railway station is located on the Main Northern line, serving the Sydney suburb of Asquith. It is served by Sydney Trains T1 North Shore Line and some early morning and late night NSW TrainLink Central Coast & Newcastle Line services.

History
Asquith station opened on 1 November 1915. South of the station lies Hornsby Maintenance Depot.

Platforms and services

Transport links
Transdev NSW operates three routes via Asquith station:
592: Hornsby station to Brooklyn and Mooney Mooney
595: Hornsby station to Arthurs Circle
597: Hornsby station to Berowra station and Berowra Heights

References

External links

Asquith station details Transport for New South Wales

Railway stations in Sydney
Railway stations in Australia opened in 1915
Short-platform railway stations in New South Wales, 6 cars
Asquith, New South Wales
Main North railway line, New South Wales